Ctenotus ariadnae, also known commonly as Ariadna's ctenotus,  is a species of skink, a lizard in the family Scincidae. The species is endemic to Australia.

Etymology
The specific name, ariadnae, is in honor of Ariadna Neumann who was the Librarian of the Western Australian Museum.

Geographic range
C. ariadnae is found in central Australia, in the following portions of the Australian states and territories: eastern Western Australia, northern South Australia, southwestern Queensland, and southern Northern Territory.

Habitat
The preferred natural habitats of C. ariadne are desert and grassland.

Description

Diet
C. ariadnae preys mainly on termites, but also on other insects and spiders.

Reproduction
C. ariadnae is oviparous.

References

Further reading
Cogger HG (2014). Reptiles and Amphibians of Australia, Seventh Edition. Clayton, Victoria, Australia: CSIRO Publishing. xxx + 1,033 pp. .
Storr GM (1969). "The genus Ctenotus (Lacertilia: Scincidae) in the Eastern Division of Western Australia". Journal of the Royal Society of Western Australia 51 (4): 97–109. (Ctenotus ariadnae, new species, p. 104).
Wilson S, Swan G (2013). A Complete Guide to Reptiles of Australia, Fourth Edition. Sydney: New Holland Publishers. 522 pp. .

ariadnae
Reptiles described in 1969
Taxa named by Glen Milton Storr